Walicki is a Polish surname. Notable people with the surname include:

 Andrzej Walicki (1930–2020), Polish historian
 Franciszek Walicki (1921–2015), Polish big beat and rock singer

The female form is Walicka.

Polish-language surnames